"Hey Now" is a song written and recorded by the American rock band Tantric. It was released as the lead single from their 2004 second studio album After We Go on December 9, 2003.

Charts

2003 singles
2003 songs
Tantric (band) songs
Songs written by Nuno Bettencourt
Songs written by Matt Taul
Songs written by Hugo Ferreira
Songs written by Jesse Vest
Songs written by Todd Whitener
Maverick Records singles
Nu metal songs